Lars-Michael "Micke" Leijnegard, (born 11 August 1964 in Sävsjö) is a Swedish journalist and television presenter for SVT. Leijengard has hosted  Gomorron Sverige and Mästarnas mästare.

References

1964 births
Living people
Swedish journalists
Swedish television hosts